George Holliday may refer to:
George Holliday (bobsleigh) (1917–1990), British Olympic bobsledder
George Holliday (1959/1960–2021), American witness who videotaped the beating of Rodney King